The men's 5000 metres event at the 2006 Commonwealth Games was held on March 20.

Results

References
Results

5000
2006